A poly-cap is a small bushing used to create smooth joints, or to keep something in place without glue in scale-models. They are usually found on well-engineered kits such as those by Tamiya and Bandai who have employed them for a long time.

A typical "cap" is just a small cylinder but many other shapes exists. Bandai for example have a wide range of designs used in their robot-kits (Gundam, etc.).

Typical uses include
 Wheel or sprocket-hubs
 Pivot-points for guns
 Joints in robotic limbs

Hardware (mechanical)